Albertus "Bert" John Eckhoff (18 October 1901 – 9 December 1967) was a professional New Zealand rugby league footballer who played in the 1920s.

Rugby career
Bert Eckhoff began his career playing club rugby for the Zingari-Richmond club in Otago in 1922. He made 5 appearances for the Otago B side that same season. He was listed in the reserves to play Auckland for the full Otago side but did not take the field. In 1923 he was in the reserves to play for Otago in further matches and made his debut coming on for an injured player in their match with Auckland on 1 September. He then also played against North Otago a month later.

In 1924 while playing a club match for Zingari-Richmond against Alhambra on June 21 he was alleged to have kicked an opponent in the chest as he lay on the ground following a scrum. A lengthy meeting was held by the Otago union looking into the matter involving numerous witnesses as they sought to find the offending player. Eventually it was concluded that Eckhoff was the offender and after a further period of debate it was decided to suspend him until July 1926. Soon after this Eckhoff switched to rugby league which at that time did not recognise suspensions in the rugby code as it does today. Despite multiple appeals the union stuck to their original decision.

Switch to rugby league
In 1924 Eckhoff joined the newly formed City Rovers club based in Dunedin though they did not play any matches as it was the tail end of the season. He was selected to play for the Otago side against Canterbury which they won on September 6, and he was again in the victorious side which defeated the same opponents a month later on October 4.

During the 1932 season Eckhoff decided to retire from playing and to make himself available as a referee. However he was soon drawn out of retirement to play the remainder of the year for City who were having a strong season. In so doing he brought up his 100th appearance for City.

He retired at the end of the season and refereed senior matches each week throughout 1933 and 1934 before the competition in Otago ceased entirely.

International honours
Eckhoff represented New Zealand in 1928 in the 3rd test against Great Britain. He was selected for the 1930 NZ tour of Australia where he was appointed vice-captain.

References

External links
Statistics at rugbyleagueproject.org

New Zealand national rugby league team players
New Zealand rugby league players
Otago rugby union players
South Island rugby league team players
Otago rugby league team players
Place of birth missing
Place of death missing
Rugby league props
Rugby league second-rows
1901 births
1967 deaths